Kazemabad (also Romanized as Kāz̧emābād) is a village in Darbqazi Rural District, in the Central District of Nishapur County, Razavi Khorasan Province, Iran. At the 2006 census, its population was 55, in 9 families.

References 

Populated places in Nishapur County